"Smile for Me" is a song by R&B singer Massari. It was released in January 2005 as the lead single from his self-titled debut album Massari. It features vocals from rapper Loon.

Music video
A music video was made for the song by RT!. It features Massari and Loon with their love interests with other scenes showing them shopping, flirting and dancing with a number of women. The video features the first verse of "Be Easy" at the end.

Charts

References

2004 songs
2005 debut singles
Massari songs
CP Music Group singles
Songs written by Belly (rapper)
Songs written by Loon (rapper)
Songs written by Massari